The 1932–33 New York Rangers season was the franchise's seventh season. In the regular season, the Rangers finished third in the American Division with a 23–17–8 record. New York qualified for the Stanley Cup playoffs, where the Rangers defeated the Montreal Canadiens 8–5 in the quarter-finals and the Detroit Red Wings 6–3 in the semi-finals to reach the Stanley Cup Finals for the fourth time in franchise history. In the Cup Finals, New York defeated the Toronto Maple Leafs, three games to one to win the second Stanley Cup in New York Rangers history.

Regular season

Final standings

Record vs. opponents

Schedule and results

|- align="center" bgcolor="#CCFFCC"
| 1 || 10 || @ Montreal Maroons || 4–2 || 1–0–0
|- align="center" bgcolor="#FFBBBB"
| 2 || 12 || @ Toronto Maple Leafs || 4–2 || 1–1–0
|- align="center" bgcolor="#CCFFCC"
| 3 || 20 || Toronto Maple Leafs || 7–0 || 2–1–0
|- align="center" bgcolor="white"
| 4 || 24 || Chicago Black Hawks || 1 – 1 OT || 2–1–1
|- align="center" bgcolor="#CCFFCC"
| 5 || 29 || @ Boston Bruins || 6–4 || 3–1–1
|-

|- align="center" bgcolor="#CCFFCC"
| 6 || 1 || @ Detroit Red Wings || 4–2 || 4–1–1
|- align="center" bgcolor="#FFBBBB"
| 7 || 4 || @ Chicago Black Hawks || 4–3 || 4–2–1
|- align="center" bgcolor="#CCFFCC"
| 8 || 6 || Montreal Canadiens || 5–3 || 5–2–1
|- align="center" bgcolor="#CCFFCC"
| 9 || 8 || New York Americans || 3–1 || 6–2–1
|- align="center" bgcolor="#CCFFCC"
| 10 || 11 || Boston Bruins || 3 – 1 OT || 7–2–1
|- align="center" bgcolor="white"
| 11 || 13 || @ Montreal Canadiens || 1 – 1 OT || 7–2–2
|- align="center" bgcolor="#CCFFCC"
| 12 || 15 || @ New York Americans || 3–2 || 8–2–2
|- align="center" bgcolor="white"
| 13 || 17 || @ Ottawa Senators || 2 – 2 OT || 8–2–3
|- align="center" bgcolor="#FFBBBB"
| 14 || 20 || Detroit Red Wings || 4–1 || 8–3–3
|- align="center" bgcolor="#CCFFCC"
| 15 || 25 || Montreal Maroons || 2–0 || 9–3–3
|- align="center" bgcolor="#CCFFCC"
| 16 || 29 || Ottawa Senators || 4–2 || 10–3–3
|- align="center" bgcolor="#FFBBBB"
| 17 || 31 || @ Montreal Maroons || 4–2 || 10–4–3
|-

|- align="center" bgcolor="#CCFFCC"
| 18 || 3 || Toronto Maple Leafs || 4–2 || 11–4–3
|- align="center" bgcolor="white"
| 19 || 8 || New York Americans || 2 – 2 OT || 11–4–4
|- align="center" bgcolor="#FFBBBB"
| 20 || 10 || @ Toronto Maple Leafs || 3–2 || 11–5–4
|- align="center" bgcolor="#CCFFCC"
| 21 || 12 || Boston Bruins || 3–1 || 12–5–4
|- align="center" bgcolor="#CCFFCC"
| 22 || 15 || @ Chicago Black Hawks || 5–0 || 13–5–4
|- align="center" bgcolor="#FFBBBB"
| 23 || 17 || @ Detroit Red Wings || 2–0 || 13–6–4
|- align="center" bgcolor="#CCFFCC"
| 24 || 19 || Montreal Canadiens || 2–1 || 14–6–4
|- align="center" bgcolor="#FFBBBB"
| 25 || 22 || Montreal Maroons || 5–0 || 14–7–4
|- align="center" bgcolor="#CCFFCC"
| 26 || 24 || @ New York Americans || 3–2 || 15–7–4
|- align="center" bgcolor="#FFBBBB"
| 27 || 26 || Chicago Black Hawks || 3–1 || 15–8–4
|- align="center" bgcolor="#CCFFCC"
| 28 || 28 || @ Ottawa Senators || 9–2 || 16–8–4
|- align="center" bgcolor="#FFBBBB"
| 29 || 31 || Detroit Red Wings || 2–1 || 16–9–4
|-

|- align="center" bgcolor="white"
| 30 || 2 || @ Montreal Maroons || 2 – 2 OT || 16–9–5
|- align="center" bgcolor="#CCFFCC"
| 31 || 5 || New York Americans || 4–1 || 17–9–5
|- align="center" bgcolor="#FFBBBB"
| 32 || 7 || @ Boston Bruins || 2–1 || 17–10–5
|- align="center" bgcolor="white"
| 33 || 9 || Ottawa Senators || 3 – 3 OT || 17–10–6
|- align="center" bgcolor="#FFBBBB"
| 34 || 11 || @ Toronto Maple Leafs || 2–1 || 17–11–6
|- align="center" bgcolor="#CCFFCC"
| 35 || 14 || @ Ottawa Senators || 3–1 || 18–11–6
|- align="center" bgcolor="#FFBBBB"
| 36 || 16 || Toronto Maple Leafs || 5–2 || 18–12–6
|- align="center" bgcolor="#CCFFCC"
| 37 || 18 || @ Montreal Canadiens || 3–1 || 19–12–6
|- align="center" bgcolor="white"
| 38 || 21 || Chicago Black Hawks || 2 – 2 OT || 19–12–7
|- align="center" bgcolor="#FFBBBB"
| 39 || 23 || @ Detroit Red Wings || 3–0 || 19–13–7
|- align="center" bgcolor="#CCFFCC"
| 40 || 26 || @ Chicago Black Hawks || 4–1 || 20–13–7
|-

|- align="center" bgcolor="#FFBBBB"
| 41 || 5 || Boston Bruins || 2–1 || 20–14–7
|- align="center" bgcolor="#CCFFCC"
| 42 || 9 || Detroit Red Wings || 3–2 || 21–14–7
|- align="center" bgcolor="#CCFFCC"
| 43 || 12 || @ New York Americans || 8–2 || 22–14–7
|- align="center" bgcolor="white"
| 44 || 14 || Ottawa Senators || 3 – 3 OT || 22–14–8
|- align="center" bgcolor="#FFBBBB"
| 45 || 16 || @ Montreal Canadiens || 2–1 || 22–15–8
|- align="center" bgcolor="#FFBBBB"
| 46 || 19 || Montreal Maroons || 6–3 || 22–16–8
|- align="center" bgcolor="#FFBBBB"
| 47 || 21 || @ Boston Bruins || 3–2 || 22–17–8
|- align="center" bgcolor="#CCFFCC"
| 48 || 23 || Montreal Canadiens || 4–2 || 23–17–8
|-

Playoffs

Stanley Cup Final
The Rangers, led by brothers Bill and Bun Cook on the right and left wings, respectively, and Frank Boucher at center, would defeat the Toronto Maple Leafs in the 1932–33 best-of-five finals, three games to one, to win their second Stanley Cup, exacting revenge on the Leafs' "Kid line" of Busher Jackson, Joe Primeau, and Charlie Conacher.

After game one, the Rangers would vacate Madison Square Garden for the circus. Bill Cook would become the first player to score a Cup-winning goal in overtime. Rookie goalie Andy Aitkenhead would post the fourth shutout by a rookie in the finals.

Key:  Win  Loss

Player statistics
Skaters

Goaltenders

†Denotes player spent time with another team before joining Rangers. Stats reflect time with Rangers only.
‡Traded mid-season. Stats reflect time with Rangers only.

Awards and records
 Lady Byng Memorial Trophy: || Frank Boucher
 Ching Johnson, Defence, NHL First Team All-Star
 Frank Boucher, Centre, NHL First Team All-Star
 Bill Cook, Right Wing, NHL First Team All-Star
 Lester Patrick, Coach, NHL First Team All-Star

Transactions

See also
 1932–33 NHL season

References

External links
 Rangers on Hockey Database

New York Rangers seasons
New York Rangers
New York Rangers
New York Rangers
New York Rangers
Madison Square Garden
Stanley Cup championship seasons
1930s in Manhattan